Saratoga Township, Illinois may refer to one of the following townships:

 Saratoga Township, Grundy County, Illinois
 Saratoga Township, Marshall County, Illinois

See also

Saratoga Township (disambiguation)

Illinois township disambiguation pages